Allan Crombie McCasker (6 October 1902 – 29 July 1983) was an Australian rules footballer who played for the North Melbourne Football Club in the Victorian Football League (VFL).

He later served in the Royal Australian Air Force during World War II.

Notes

External links 

Allan McCasker's playing statistics from The VFA Project

1902 births
1983 deaths
Australian rules footballers from Victoria (Australia)
Northcote Football Club players
North Melbourne Football Club players
Military personnel from Victoria (Australia)